Dhenkanal Lok Sabha constituency is one of the 21 Lok Sabha (parliamentary) constituencies in Odisha state in eastern India.

Assembly segments
After delimitation of Dhenkanal Lok Sabha constituency, the seven legislative assembly segments which constitute this parliamentary constituency are: 

Before delimitation in 2008, legislative assembly segments which constituted this parliamentary constituency were: Birmaharajpur, Athmallik, Angul, Hindol, Dhenkanal, Gondia and Kamakhyanagar.

Members of Parliament
2019: Mahesh Sahoo, Biju Janata Dal
2014: Tathagata Satapathy, Biju Janata Dal
2009: Tathagata Satapathy, Biju Janata Dal
2004: Tathagata Satapathy, Biju Janata Dal
1999: Kamakhya Prasad Singh Deo, Indian National Congress
1998: Tathagata Satapathy, Biju Janata Dal
1996: Kamakhya Prasad Singh Deo, Indian National Congress
1991: Kamakhya Prasad Singh Deo, Indian National Congress
1989: Bhajaman Behara, Janata Dal
1984: Kamakhya Prasad Singh Deo, Indian National Congress
1980: Kamakhya Prasad Singh Deo, Indian National Congress (I)
1977: Devendra Satapathy, Bharatiya Lok Dal
1971: Devendra Satapathy, Indian National Congress
1967: Kamakhya Prasad Singh Deo, Swatantra Party
1962: Baishnab Charan Patnaik, Indian National Congress
1957: Surendra Mohanty, Ganatantra Parishad
1952: Sharangdhar Das, PSP
1952: Niranjan Jena, Indian National Congress

Election result

2019 Election Result
In 2019 Indian general election, Biju Janata Dal candidate Mahesh Sahoo defeated Bharatiya Janata Party candidate Rudra Narayan Pany by a margin of 35,412 votes.

2014 Election Result
In 2014 election, Biju Janata Dal candidate Tathagat Satapathy defeated Bharatiya Janata Party candidate Rudra Narayan Pany by a margin of 1,37,340 votes.

General Election 2009

References

Lok Sabha constituencies in Odisha
Dhenkanal district
Angul district